Martha Lake is a census-designated place (CDP) in Snohomish County, Washington, United States. The population was 21,129 at the 2020 census.  It lies west of Mill Creek and northeast of Lynnwood, near the lake of the same name.

Based on per capita income, one of the more reliable measures of affluence, Martha Lake ranks 95th of 522 areas in the state of Washington to be ranked.

Geography
Martha Lake is located at  (47.850802, -122.239296).

According to the United States Census Bureau, the CDP has a total area of 4.8 square miles (12.5 km2), of which, 4.8 square miles (12.3 km2) of it is land and 0.1 square miles (0.2 km2) of it (1.65%) is water.

Demographics
As of the census of 2000, there were 12,633 people, 4,602 households, and 3,419 families residing in the CDP. The population density was 2,654.0 people per square mile (1,024.7/km2). There were 4,808 housing units at an average density of 1,010.1/sq mi (390.0/km2). The racial makeup of the CDP was 58.80% White, 11.52% African American, 0.79% Native American, 12.63% Asian, 0.23% Pacific Islander, 1.30% from other races, and 3.74% from two or more races. Hispanic or Latino of any race were 19.70% of the population.

There were 4,602 households, out of which 38.2% had children under the age of 18 living with them, 60.3% were married couples living together, 9.6% had a female householder with no husband present, and 25.7% were non-families. 17.6% of all households were made up of individuals, and 3.2% had someone living alone who was 65 years of age or older. The average household size was 2.74 and the average family size was 3.10.

In the CDP, the age distribution of the population shows 27.0% under the age of 18, 8.9% from 18 to 24, 34.9% from 25 to 44, 22.6% from 45 to 64, and 6.6% who were 65 years of age or older. The median age was 34 years. For every 100 females, there were 99.4 males. For every 100 females age 18 and over, there were 98.3 males.

The median income for a household in the CDP was $57,568, and the median income for a family was $59,813. Males had a median income of $46,262 versus $32,356 for females. The per capita income for the CDP was $24,721. About 2.9% of families and 4.9% of the population were below the poverty line, including 5.4% of those under age 18 and 4.9% of those age 65 or over.

References

Census-designated places in Snohomish County, Washington
Census-designated places in Washington (state)